Margaret Daly (born 26 January 1938 the older of twins, Robert) was a British Conservative Party politician who represented Somerset and West Dorset in the European Parliament from 1984 to 1994.

She attended Methodist College Belfast.

Daly was a member of various committees including:
 Women's Rights Committees
 Economic & Monetary Affairs Committees
 Industrial Policy Committees
 Development Committees.

She attempted to be selected for the 1999 European Parliament election in the United Kingdom but was unsuccessful.

References

1938 births
Living people
Conservative Party (UK) MEPs
20th-century women MEPs for England
MEPs for England 1984–1989
MEPs for England 1989–1994
Conservative Party (UK) parliamentary candidates
People educated at Methodist College Belfast
Politicians of the Pro-Euro Conservative Party